Houdeng-Gœgnies is a village of Wallonia and a district of the municipality of La Louvière, located in the province of Hainaut, Belgium.

Former municipalities of Hainaut (province)
La Louvière